Lonesome Pine Airport  is a public airport located three miles (5 km) northeast of the central business district (CBD) of Wise, a town in Wise County, Virginia, United States. It was once served with commercial airline service on Appalachian Airlines. Currently, LNP plays host to an annual airshow, "Wings over Wise."

References

External links 

Airports in Virginia
Wise, Virginia
Buildings and structures in Wise County, Virginia
Transportation in Wise County, Virginia